Olivier Panis (born 2 September 1966) is a French former racing driver. Panis  raced  in Formula One for ten seasons,  earning his first and only win at the 1996 Monaco Grand Prix for the Ligier team.

He is the father of racing driver Aurélien Panis.

Career

Born in Oullins, Lyon, Panis, like many Formula 1 racing drivers, raced karts early in his career. With support of his father, Jean Panis (1939-2018), a donut baker.  After graduating from karts, Olivier raced several years in a number of "junior" series before racing in French Formula 3.  He won a championship in Formula Renault in 1989 and finished second in French Formula 3 in 1991.  He eventually found himself in Formula 3000, and he won the series' championship there in 1993.

Formula One

The 27-year-old Panis earned an F1 drive in 1994 for the French-based Ligier team.  He made his debut at Brazil, finishing eleventh.  He earned a surprise second place that season at Hockenheim ahead of teammate Éric Bernard, and finished 11th in the standings for the marque. He finished every race except France.  He was however disqualified in Portugal for illegal skid block wear.

He earned another surprise second place at the 1995 Australian Grand Prix, in spite of being two laps behind the leader Damon Hill, and he also added a handful of fourths to his resume, giving him an 8th-place finish in the championship.

Panis took a shock win in the 1996 Monaco Grand Prix. Starting 14th on a wet track, Panis passed other rivals on the narrow circuit, including Martin Brundle, Mika Häkkinen and Johnny Herbert, and timed his change onto slick tyres perfectly.  He overtook Eddie Irvine at the Lowes Hairpin and was running in third place before the Williams-Renault of Damon Hill and Benetton-Renault of Jean Alesi both hit terminal technical difficulties. One of only 3 cars to finish the race, (Brits David Coulthard and Johnny Herbert being the other two) Panis held off a late charge from Coulthard to win.  The race finished on 75 of the 78 scheduled laps due to the two-hour time limit being reached.  Panis' victory was the Ligier team's first victory in 15 years (and their last), and it was the first French victory in a French car at Monaco in 66 years.  However, it was the only highlight to his  season, and he otherwise failed to do any better than 5th place in Hungary.

Panis had the potential for a big season in  while driving for Alain Prost, who had purchased Ligier. On Bridgestone tyres, he took the tyre company's first podium at Brazil.  He was running second in Argentina before retirement.  After 6 races, he stood third in the championship thanks to another podium finish with second place in Spain. A win could have been possible in that race had he not been held up lapping backmarkers for seven laps, losing him a total of 6 seconds to leader Jacques Villeneuve. At the 1997 Canadian Grand Prix, he broke both legs in a high-speed accident, causing him to miss the next seven races of the season.  His place in the team was taken by Jarno Trulli, until he returned for the final three races of the season. He achieved sixth place at Luxembourg and appeared to show that he had fully recovered from his accident, as he drove as well as he had done before the crash.  Despite missing half of the year, he still managed 9th in the championship with 16 points.

1998 would prove to be a difficult season for Panis. He failed to score a single point for the Prost team, primarily due to a poor quality car. However, his full potential was restricted by the pins which remained in his legs, a legacy of the surgery following his crash in 1997. The highlight of the season was a ninth-place finish in Australia, although he also ran strongly at the 1998 Canadian Grand Prix until car failure intervened. An indicator of the team's problems in 1998 was the solitary point scored by Panis' team-mate Jarno Trulli at Spa-Francorchamps.

The following year saw an improvement for the partnership. A stronger car, and unusual circumstances, saw an irregular return to form for the Frenchman. After a troubled race he still claimed 6th in Brazil, a feat he repeated at Hockenheim. He began to qualify much more strongly, with a third place in France, fifth at the Nurburgring, and sixth at Suzuka, where he spent the first stages of the race in third. Despite the signs of a return to form in 1999, strategical errors and misfortune restricted his points tally. Irrespective of the improvements, Panis ended his relationship with the Prost team.

Panis was a consideration to drive for Williams, a team that was in a state of flux at the time, but turned it down to test for McLaren. This helped showcase Panis to other top teams in F1, where he would regularly match the testing times of regular drivers David Coulthard and double World Champion Mika Häkkinen. Due to this he landed a drive with BAR for 2001. BAR wasn't the top team he had hoped, and he finished in 14th place during both of the years he was there, scoring a total of 8 points.  His highest finish for BAR was in Brazil with fourth position.  He had been fourth at his debut race for the team in Australia but was penalised for a yellow flag infringement which added twenty five seconds to his race time and put him seventh, and enabled Kimi Räikkönen to score a debut point.

Panis left for Toyota's racing team in 2003. He was signed to drive and provide the second-year team his knowledge, as well as help his new Brazilian teammate, Cristiano da Matta, learn the ropes of F1. Early results were an improvement, in part because he handled the new one-lap qualifying well, but the end result wasn't much different from previous seasons, as he was 15th with 6 points.

Panis remained with Toyota for 2004, his tenth season in Formula One. In early October 2004 he announced his intention to retire from racing following the 2004 Japanese Grand Prix; he planned to continue at Toyota as a test driver in 2005 and 2006. Before his retirement, he was the oldest active driver in F1 at the age of 37.  2004 saw him again score only 6 points, before being replaced for Brazil by his Brazilian teammate test driver Ricardo Zonta.

He was the nominated third driver for Toyota in France in 2005, but this was the last time he participated competitively at a Grand Prix weekend.  On 18 September 2006, Panis announced his complete retirement from F1 in order to race in other disciplines. His final outing as a Formula 1 test driver took place at Jerez, Spain on 14 December 2006.

Panis was highly regarded for his racecraft. He was also considered by the likes of Häkkinen, who was particularly upset when Panis left the McLaren testing team to return to full-time driving, to be one of the best test-drivers in the field.

Sport cars

He returned to racing in 2008 with the Oreca Courage team in the Le Mans Series. He has also worked as a consultant for the French A1 Grand Prix team and participated in the Andros Trophy ice race. He had an appearance in an episode of Top Gear, facing the team in an ice race, where he was jokingly referred to in the intro as 'France's second-best racing driver', presumably to Alain Prost.

Racing record

Career summary

Complete International Formula 3000 results
(key) (Races in bold indicate pole position) (Races
in italics indicate fastest lap)

Complete Formula One results
(key) (Races in bold indicate pole position; races in italics indicate fastest lap)

† Did not finish, but was classified as he had completed more than 90% of the race distance.

Complete GT1 World Championship results

24 Hours of Le Mans results

References

External links

Olivier Panis Official website

1966 births
Living people
French racing drivers
French Formula Renault 2.0 drivers
French Formula One drivers
Formula One race winners
International Formula 3000 Champions
French Formula Three Championship drivers
Sportspeople from Lyon Metropolis
Ligier Formula One drivers
Prost Formula One drivers
BAR Formula One drivers
Toyota Formula One drivers
International Formula 3000 drivers
24 Hours of Le Mans drivers
European Le Mans Series drivers
American Le Mans Series drivers
FIA GT1 World Championship drivers
French sports agents
Blancpain Endurance Series drivers
24 Hours of Spa drivers
Sports car racing team owners
12 Hours of Sebring drivers
People from Oullins
Oreca drivers
Graff Racing drivers
DAMS drivers
W Racing Team drivers
Saintéloc Racing drivers
Comtoyou Racing drivers